This is a list of airports served by KLM Cityhopper. This list does not include cities which are served solely by its parent company KLM.

Destinations

See also
List of KLM destinations
List of Air France destinations
List of Martinair destinations
List of Martinair Cargo destinations
List of Transavia destinations
List of Transavia France destinations

References

Lists of airline destinations
Air France–KLM
KLM Cityhopper